Syrnola fernandina is a species of sea snail, a marine gastropod mollusk in the family Pyramidellidae, the pyrams and their allies.

Description
The length of the shell measures 6 mm.

Distribution
This species was found in the Atlantic Ocean off Georgia, USA at depths between 538 m and 805 m.

References

External links
 To Encyclopedia of Life
 To World Register of Marine Species

Pyramidellidae
Gastropods described in 1927